The 1943 Burton-on-Trent by-election was held on 2 July 1943.  The byelection was held due to the resignation  of the incumbent Conservative MP, John Gretton.  It was won by the unopposed Conservative candidate John Gretton.

References

1943 elections in the United Kingdom
1943 in England
20th century in Staffordshire
July 1943 events
Burton upon Trent
By-elections to the Parliament of the United Kingdom in Staffordshire constituencies
Unopposed by-elections to the Parliament of the United Kingdom (need citation)